The Town of Cooktown is the former local government area for Cooktown in Far North Queensland, Australia. It existed from 1876 to 1932.

History

On 3 April 1876, Cooktown was established as a separate municipality, the Borough of Cooktown.

On 11 November 1879, the Daintree was created as a local government for the coastal land surrounding Cooktown.

On 31 March 1903 with the passage of the Local Authorities Act 1902, the Borough of Cooktown became the Town of Cooktown and the Daintree Division became the Shire of Daintree.

On 16 January 1919, the Shire of Daintree was merged with the Shire of Hann to create the Shire of Cook, covering much of Cape York Peninsula.

On 4 August 1932, the Town of Cooktown was abolished and absorbed into the Shire of Cook.

Mayors

The mayors of the town were:
 1876-1877: John Walsh
1878: Hector Menzies
1879: S. Samper
1880: Andrew Thredgold
1881: Robert Baird
1882: John Davis
1883: F.C. Hodel
1884-1885: Edward D'Arcy
1886-1887: John Davis
1888: James Savage, or John Davis
1889-1890: John Davis
1891: ????
1892: J. Young
1893: J. Clunn, junior
1894-1895: J.L. Adams
1896: W.T. Sleep
1897: J.B. Martin
 1898-1901: P. E. Seagren 
1902-1903: J.H. Hargreaves
1904: G. Fellows and J.H. Hargreaves
1905-1908:  P.E. Seagren
1909-1911: George A. Love
1912: W.P Anderson
1913-1917: George A. Love
1918-1922: ????
1923: A. S. Sampson
1924-1925: S.J. Keane
1926: ????
 1927: Stephen John Keane 
1928: J. Martin
1929: Henry Lee

References

External links
 

Former local government areas of Queensland
1876 establishments in Australia
1932 disestablishments in Australia